Element Capital Management is an American hedge fund using a global macroeconomic investment strategy, founded in 2005 by Jeffrey Talpins.

Company overview
Element Capital is headquartered in New York City. In 2015, the company opened an office in Mayfair, London.

In April 2017, Harvard University became a client of Element Capital, an early decision by the endowment’s then-new chief, N.P. “Narv” Narvekar.  Other investors included the John D. and Catherine T. MacArthur Foundation, the Teachers Retirement System of Texas, and the Alaska Permanent Fund.

The fund is almost always closed to new investments in order to remain an optimal size. The last time the fund opened to new capital was in mid-2018. It attracted $3 billion, mostly from existing clients, in just one month.

In December 2018 The Wall Street Journal reported the fund had quietly become a “heavyweight,” managing $18.2 billion.

In January 2020, in order to continue prioritizing performance over asset-gathering, the fund proactively reduced its AUM by 20%.

In early 2021, Element Capital returned about $2 billion of 2020 profits to its clients in order to maintain control of the growth of the fund, focusing on performance rather than accumulating assets.

Investment strategy 
The fund uses a global macroeconomic strategy, trading based on political and economic trends, rather than the fundamental analysis of individual companies. Talpins uses options to try to capture growth from strategies aimed at predicting global economic shifts while also limiting potential losses from those strategies.

Performance 
Since launching in 2005 the fund averaged 21% annual returns, as of March 2019,  with no down years.  During the global financial crises of 2008, the fund returned 35%, and in 2009 it gained 79%.

Key people
Jeffrey Talpins is the founder of Element and its chief investment officer since the fund launced in April 2005.

In 2012, Adam Prestandrea joined Element Capital, stepping down as co-head of investments at Arpad Busson’s EIM SA.

In October 2019, the company hired Colin Teichholtz, former Blue Mountain Capital fixed-income head, to research macro investment strategies and policy developments as part of the portfolio team.

In September 2021, Element hired former member of the Bank of England's rate-setting Monetary Policy Committee, Gertjan Vlieghe, as its chief economist.

Awards and recognition
In 2020, Element won Institutional Investor’s Macro Hedge Fund Manager of the Year award.

The company was the winner of Pensions & Investments "Best Places to Work in Money Management, Medium Employers," in 2019 and 2020.

Element Capital won awards in "Long Term (10 year) Performance"  at the Absolute Return Awards in 2015, 2016 and 2017.

The company won Absolute Return "Macro Fund of the Year" in 2015, 2016 and 2018.

In 2018 Element won Absolute Return "Fund of the Year.

In 2016 and 2017 Element Capital won "Macro Hedge Fund of the Year" at the Institutional Investment Awards.

Element Capital was ranked 17th on Penta's Top 100 Hedge Funds for 2016. 

In 2016, Hedge Fund Alert named Element Capital to its list of Top 200 Hedge Fund Managers at #32.

In 2019, the WSJ identified Element Capital as one of the hedge fund sector's top-performing funds.

Barron's listed Element Capital among its Top 100 Hedge Funds in 8 of the last 10 years including 2015 (65th); 2016 (17th);  and 2017 (23rd).

References

External links
 

Financial services companies established in 2007
Hedge fund firms in New York City
American companies established in 2007
2007 establishments in New York City
Hedge funds